Acanthodica emittens is a moth of the family Noctuidae. It is found on Jamaica.

External links
Species info

Catocalina
Moths of the Caribbean
Moths described in 1857